Tento may refer to:
Mount Tento, on the island of Hokkaido in Japan
, Japanese for sky lantern
, a district in the city of Iizuka, Fukuoka, Japan
Tentō Station
, a city in the series Grenadier
Portuguese for tiento, a musical genre originating in 15th century Spain

See also
Tendō (disambiguation)